William Colman,  D.D. (6 January 1728 – 26 December 1794) was a priest and academic in the second half of the eighteenth century.

Douglas was born in Northamptonshire. He was educated at Corpus Christi College, Cambridge, graduating B.A. in 1750; MA in 1750; and B.D. in 1761. He was appointed Fellow in 1759; and Master in 1778. He was Vice-Chancellor of the University of Cambridge from 1779 to 1780; and again from 1793 to 1794. He was ordained in 1756 and was the incumbent at St Bene't's Church from 1759 to 1773; and then of St Mary, Stalbridge from then until his death.

References 

Alumni of Corpus Christi College, Cambridge
Fellows of Corpus Christi College, Cambridge
Masters of Corpus Christi College, Cambridge
18th-century English Anglican priests
1794 deaths
1728 births
People from Northamptonshire
Vice-Chancellors of the University of Cambridge